Sast is a small village in the Wakhan Corridor of Afghanistan. It should not be confused with Sast, the village of the same name in Iran, or Sust, in Gilgit-Baltistan, Pakistan. Sast is located in Badakshan Province, as is the Corridor.

See also
Badakhshan Province

References

Populated places in Badakhshan Province